Frea nyassana is a species of beetle in the family Cerambycidae. It was described by Per Olof Christopher Aurivillius in 1914 and is known from Malawi. It feeds on Pinus patula.

References

nyassana
Beetles described in 1914